Extinction of Ascension flightless crake
Death of Alexandre Rodrigues Ferreira
Franco Andrea Bonelli discovers Bonelli's warbler and Bonelli's eagle named by Louis Vieillot in 1819 and 1822 respectively.
Karl Heinrich Bergius arrives in Cape Town
Constantine Samuel Rafinesque publishes Analyse de la Nature ou tableau de l'univers et des corps organisés in Palermo
Karl Heinrich Bergius arrives in Cape Town in order to make natural history collections for the Berlin Museum

Ongoing events
Coenraad Jacob Temminck  Histoire naturelle générale des pigeons et des gallinacés New species described in this work in 1815 include the undulated tinamou, the red-winged tinamou, the brown tinamou, the Tataupa tinamou the grey tinamou and  the spotted nothura
James Francis Stephens General Zoology New species described in this work in 1815 include the African cuckoo the greater coucal, the  golden-breasted bunting, the chestnut-breasted malkoha the red-chested cuckoo, the lesser honeyguide the Narina trogon and Klaas's cuckoo

Birding and ornithology by year
1815 in science